is a military aerodrome of the Japan Maritime Self-Defense Force . It is located in Shimonoseki, Yamaguchi Prefecture, Japan.

Accidents and incidents
28 September 2009, Japanese Maritime Self Defense Force YS-11M-A serial number 9044 overran the runway upon landing and was substantially damaged.

References

Airports in Japan
Transport in Yamaguchi Prefecture
Japan Maritime Self-Defense Force bases
Buildings and structures in Yamaguchi Prefecture